Fraser Herald of Arms (Héraut Fraser in French) is the title of one of the officers of arms at the Canadian Heraldic Authority in Ottawa. Like the other heralds at the Authority, the name is derived from the Canadian river of the same name.  Since the inception of the office, Fraser Herald of Arms has been the principal artist of the Canadian Heraldic Authority. As such, Fraser is responsible for overseeing the artwork created for all grants of arms emanating from the Authority.

The design of the badge of office of Fraser Herald of Arms combines symbolism of the sun and water. This is indicative of the fact that the Fraser River is the most important river in British Columbia, which features a sun on its provincial coat of arms. Traditionally, water is depicted in heraldry by white and blue wavy stripes, and the substitution here of gold for white makes a reference to the gold deposits in the Fraser River. At the center of the badge is a cinquefoil, a stylized heraldic strawberry flower of five petals. As this is a feature of coats of arms within the Scottish Clan Fraser (canting arms on fraisier, French for strawberry plant), it pays tribute to the river's namesake, the explorer Simon Fraser. The badge can be blazoned as 'A sun in splendour the disk barry wavy azure and or charged with a fraise argent the straight rays or the wavy azure' (Canadian Public Register).

Holders of the office
1989–present Cathy Bursey-Sabourin

See also
Herald
Royal Heraldry Society of Canada

External links
 Canadian Heraldic Authority
 Canadian Herladic Authority's Public Register of Arms, Flags and Badges – Badge of office

Offices of arms
Fraser River
Canadian Heraldic Authority